Richard Lynch (February 12, 1940 – June 19, 2012) was an American actor best known for portraying villains in films and television.

His film credits included The Sword and the Sorcerer, Invasion USA, The Seven-Ups, Scarecrow, Little Nikita, Bad Dreams, God Told Me To, and Halloween. He appeared in science fiction productions, including Battlestar Galactica (as Wolfe) and its sequel series Galactica 1980 (as Commander Xaviar). He also appeared in such shows as Starsky and Hutch, Baretta, T. J. Hooker, Blue Thunder, Airwolf, The A-Team, Charmed, Vega$, Murder She Wrote, and Star Trek: The Next Generation.

Early life and career
Richard Hugh Lynch was born on February 12, 1940 (sometimes incorrectly cited as 1936) in Brooklyn, New York City to Catholic parents of Irish descent. Richard Lynch served in the United States Marine Corps for four years. His younger brother is actor Barry Lynch. 

Lynch's distinct scarred appearance made him a popular nemesis, and he can be seen in more than 160 film and television performances. The scars came from a 1967 incident in New York's Central Park in which, under the influence of drugs, he set himself on fire, burning more than 70% of his body. He spent a year in recovery, gave up drug use and ultimately began training at The Actors Studio and at the HB Studio. In 1970, he co-starred with Robert De Niro, Sally Kirkland and Diane Ladd in the short-lived off-Broadway play One Night Stands of a Noisy Passenger, written by Shelley Winters. He often played a villain in features, including Scarecrow, which marked his film debut, The Seven-Ups, Bad Dreams, The Sword and the Sorcerer, and Little Nikita.

In 1982, Lynch won a Saturn Award for Best Supporting Actor for his performance as the evil King Cromwell in The Sword and the Sorcerer. Although Richard Lynch is best known for playing villains, he was cast as the president of the United States in the 2007 film Mil Mascaras vs. the Aztec Mummy. Lynch starred alongside Judson Scott in the 1982 short-lived science fiction TV series The Phoenix.

In addition to acting, Lynch was a musician, and he played the saxophone, guitar, piano, and flute. He held Irish citizenship through his Irish-born parents and was a frequent visitor to Ireland. He starred together with brother Barry in the films Nightforce and Total Force. Lynch's wife Lily starred with him in the film Breaking the Silence (1998) and son Christopher Lynch appeared with him in the science fiction film Trancers II. In 1977, Richard Lynch shared the stage with actor Al Pacino, a close friend, in the Broadway play The Basic Training of Pavlo Hummel. Lynch played a Vietnam veteran who used a wheelchair, and was nominated for a Tony in 1977.

Through the years, Lynch worked with friend and colleague Don Calfa in the films Necronomicon (1993), Toughguy (1995), Corpses Are Forever (2003), and Lewisburg (2009).

Later life and death
Lynch married twice — once to Béatrix Lynch (their son Christopher died in 2005 from pneumonia), and later to Lily Lynch.

Lynch's body was found in his home in Yucca Valley, California on June 19, 2012. It is not known if Lynch died on June 18 or June 19. After not having heard from Lynch for several days, friend and actress Carol Vogel went to his home to find the door open and his body in his kitchen. The cause of death was given as a heart attack. He was survived by his brother Barry and two sisters, Carole Taylor and Cathy Jones. Some news reports following his death incorrectly identified his birth year as 1936, but the obituary in the Los Angeles Times published by his family correctly listed the year as 1940.

Filmography

Films
 1973 Scarecrow as Riley
 1973 The Seven-Ups as Moon
 1974 Starsky & Hutch as Art
 1975 The Happy Hooker as The Cop
 1976 The Premonition as Jude
 1976 God Told Me To as Bernard Phillips
 1977 The Baron as Joey
 1977 Stunts as Pete Lustig
 1978 Deathsport as Ankar Moor
 1979 Steel as Dancer
 1979 Delta Fox as David 'Delta' Fox
 1979 Vampire as Prince Anton Voytek
 1980 The Ninth Configuration as Richard, 2nd Cyclist
 1980 The Formula as General Helmut Kladen / Frank Tedesco
 1981 Sizzle as Johnny O'Brien
 1982 The Sword and the Sorcerer as Titus Cromwell
 1984 Treasure: In Search of the Golden Horse as Narrator (voice)
 1985 Cut and Run as Colonel Brian Horne
 1985 Invasion U.S.A. as Mikhail Rostov
 1985 Savage Dawn as Reverend Romano
 1987 The Barbarians as Kadar
 1987 Nightforce as Bishop
 1988 Little Nikita as Scuba
 1988 Bad Dreams as Franklin Harris
 1989 One Man Force as Adams
 1989 High Stakes as 'Slim'
 1990 The Forbidden Dance as Benjamin Maxwell
 1990 Aftershock as Commander Eastern
 1990 Return to Justice as Sheriff Jethro Lincoln
 1990 Invasion Force as Michael Cooper
 1990 Lockdown as James Garrett
 1991 Alligator II: The Mutation as 'Hawk' Hawkins
 1991 Trancers II as Dr. E.D. Wardo
 1991 The Last Hero as Montoro
 1991 Puppet Master III: Toulon's Revenge as Major Kraus
 1992 Maximum Force as Max Tanabe
 1982 Inside Edge as Mario Gio
 1992 Double Threat as Detective Robert Fenich
 1993 Merlin as Pendragon
 1993 H.P. Lovecraft's: Necronomicon as Jethro De Lapoer (part 1)
 1994 Scanner Cop as Karl Glock
 1994 Cyborg 3: The Recycler as Anton Lewellyn
 1994 Midnight Confessions as Detective Harris
 1994 Dangerous Waters as Admiral
 1994 Death Match as Jimmie Fratello
 1994 Loving Deadly as Dr. Mel
 1995 Terrified as Office Worker #2
 1995 Dragon Fury
 1995 Terminal Virus as Calloway
 1995 Warrior of Justice as Doug 'The Master'
 1995 Takedown
 1995 Destination Vegas as Richard
 1996 Werewolf as Noel
 1996 Lone Tiger as Bruce Rossner
 1996 Total Force as Dr. Edmund Wellington
 1996 Diamond Run as Sloan
 1996 Vendetta as Dr. David Wilson
 1996 The Garbage Man
 1997 Under Oath as Daniel Saltarelli
 1997 Ground Rules
 1997 Divine Lovers as Gregory
 1998 Shattered Illusions as Sal
 1998 Armstrong as Colonel Vladimir Zukov
 1998 Love and War II
 1999 Lima: Breaking the Silence as James Gallagher, Ambassador of Ireland
 1999 Eastside as Mihalas Gabriel
 1999 Enemy Action as Dimitri
 2001 Death Game as Chief Canton
 2001 Ankle Bracelet as Jerry
 2002 Outta Time as Franco
 2002 Crime and Punishment as Peter Luzhin, Dunia's Suitor
 2002 Curse of the Forty-Niner as Old Man Prichard
 2003 Fabulous Shiksa in Distress as The Messenger (uncredited)
 2003 Ancient Warriors as Curtis Mayhew
 2003 The Mummy's Kiss as Dr. Wallis Harwa
 2003 Final Combat
 2003 Corpses Are Forever as General Morton
 2005 The Great Wall of Magellon as Old Akillian
 2006 Wedding Slashers as Daddy
 2007 Mil Mascaras vs. the Aztec Mummy as The President of the United States
 2007 Halloween as Principal Chambers
 2009 Dark Fields as Karl Lumis / Mr. Jones
 2009 Chrome Angels as Uncle Ted
 2009 The Rain as Karl Lumis
 2010 Resurrection as The President
 2011 Gun of the Black Sun as Damian Lupescu
 2012 The Lords of Salem as Reverend Jonathan Hawthorne (scenes deleted) (Due to poor health, Lynch was replaced by Andrew Prine during early stages of filming.)

Television
 1977 Streets of San Francisco Season 5 - Episode 23 "Time Out" as Harry Kraft
 1978 Battlestar Galactica episode Gun on Ice Planet Zero (as Wolfe)
 1978 Vega$ episode Kill Dan Tanna as Mr. North
 1981 Vega$ episode Dead Ringer as Benjamin Lang
 1979 Buck Rogers in the 25th Century as Morgan Velosi
 1979 Charlie's Angels episode Angels on the Street as Freddie Jefferson
 1978 Starsky & Hutch episode Quadromania s03 e22 as Lionel Fitzgerald III
 1979 Starsky & Hutch episode Starsky vs Hutch s04 e21 as Joey
 1980 Galactica 1980 as Commander Xaviar
 1980 Alcatraz: The Whole Shocking Story as Sam Shockley
 1982 The Phoenix as Justin Preminger
 1984 Blue Thunder as P.V.C.
 1984 The A-Team, episode “Hot styles” (3x12) as John Turian
 1984 Matt Houston, episode “Apostle of Death” as Jesse Mercer
 1985 Airwolf episode “The Horn of Plenty” as John Bradford Horn / Gerald Van Dorian / Neal Streep
 1987 The Law & Harry McGraw Season 1 - Episode 3 "Mr. Chapman, I Presume?" as Trent
 1987 Werewolf as Servan Domballe
 1989 Hunter episode “The Legion” as Frank Lassiter
 1991 Super Force Season 1 - Episodes 16 & 17 "The Sins of the Fathers" as Dr. Lothar Presley 
 1993 Star Trek: The Next Generation episode Gambit as Arctus Baran
 1992-1994 Murder, She Wrote episode To the last will I grapple with thee & Amsterdam Kill as Philip de Kooning / Michael O'Connor
 1995 Highlander: The Series as John Kirin / Cage
 1998 Mike Hammer, Private Eye as Graham Mintner 
 1999 Battlestar Galactica: The Second Coming as Count Iblis
 2003 Charmed as Cronyn

Bibliography 

Patrick Loubatière. Richard Lynch Forever (2013).

References

External links
Richard Lynch Biography (1936-)

1940 births
2012 deaths
American male film actors
American male television actors
American people of Irish descent
Irish male film actors
Irish male television actors
Irish people of American descent
Male actors from New York City
United States Marines
People from Brooklyn